The 2012 African Men's Handball Championship was the 20th edition of the African Men's Handball Championship, organized by the African Handball Confederation, which acted as the qualification process for the 2013 World Men's Handball Championship. It was the 20th edition of the tournament and was held in Rabat and Salé, Morocco between 11 and 20 January 2012. The winner qualified for the 2012 Summer Olympics.

Venues

Teams

Preliminary round
The draw was held on 24 September 2011 at Casablanca, Morocco.

All times are local (UTC±0).

Group A

Group B

All times are local (UTC±0).

Knockout stage

Bracket

5–8th bracket

All times are local (UTC±0).

Quarterfinals

5–8th semifinals

Semifinals

Eleventh place game

Ninth place game

Seventh place game

Fifth place game

Bronze medal game

Final

Final standings

Awards

All-Tournament Team
All-star team was:

See also
 2012 African Handball Champions League
 2012 African Men's Junior Handball Championship
 2012 African Men's Youth Handball Championship

References

External links
Official website
todor66.com
Goalzz.com
Statistics of CAN 2012

2012 in Moroccan sport
Men's Handball Championship
2012 in handball
Sport in Casablanca
Sport in Salé
2012 Men's
International handball competitions hosted by Morocco
January 2012 sports events in Africa